"Her Name Is" is a country song written by Bobby Braddock and made famous by George Jones. It reached No. 3 on the Hot Country Songs in 1976.

Content
The song's electric clavinet solo was played by Nashville session musician Hargus "Pig" Robbins.  Part of the song's success may have been that fans assumed George was singing about ex-wife Tammy Wynette; indeed, in the liner notes to the Jones retrospective Anniversary – 10 Years of Hits, producer Billy Sherrill confirms that song was "about Tammy."  In his 1995 memoir, Jones wryly remarked, "The public believed I was singing about Tammy.  Several reporters asked if that were true.  I purposely hedged on the question.  I was ready to let people think whatever they wanted to think if it might sell a few records.  I needed the money to pay child support to Tammy."

Chart performance

References

1976 songs
1976 singles
Epic Records singles
Songs written by Bobby Braddock
George Jones songs
Song recordings produced by Billy Sherrill